Gibberula novemprovincialis is a species of sea snail, a marine gastropod mollusk, in the family Cystiscidae.

References

novemprovincialis
Gastropods described in 1928
Cystiscidae